The 2022–23 Texas A&M Aggies men's basketball team represented Texas A&M University during the 2022–23 NCAA Division I men's basketball season. The team was led by fourth-year head coach Buzz Williams and played their home games at Reed Arena in College Station, Texas as a member of the Southeastern Conference.

Previous season 
The Aggies finished the 2021–22 season 27–13, 9–9 in SEC play to finish in a five-way tie for fifth place. As the No. 8 seed in the SEC tournament, they defeated Florida, Auburn, and Arkansas to advance to the championship game where they lost to Tennessee. They received an at-large bid to the National Invitation Tournament as a No. 1 seed. They defeated Alcorn State, Oregon, Wake Forest, and Washington State to advance to the NIT championship game. There they lost to Xavier.

Offseason

Departures

Incoming transfers

Recruiting classes

2022 recruiting class

Roster

Schedule and results

|-
!colspan=12 style=| Exhibition

|-
!colspan=12 style=| Non-conference regular season

|-
!colspan=12 style=| SEC regular season

|-
!colspan=12 style=|  SEC tournament

|-
!colspan=12 style=| NCAA Tournament

Source

See also
2022–23 Texas A&M Aggies women's basketball team

References

Texas A&M Aggies men's basketball seasons
Texas AandM Aggies
Texas AandM Aggies men's basketball
Texas AandM Aggies men's basketball
Texas A&M